Franz Tanner is a former Swiss curler. He is one of the most international titled Swiss male curlers.

Awards
World Curling Freytag Award: 2002
In 2012 he was inducted to World Curling Federation Hall of Fame

Teams

References

External links
 

Living people

Swiss male curlers
World curling champions
European curling champions
Swiss curling champions
Year of birth missing (living people)